La Rose is a surname. Notable people with the surname include:

Jean La Rose, Guyanese environmentalist
John La Rose (1927–2006), Trinidadian/English political and cultural activist
Natalie La Rose, Dutch–Surinamese singer, songwriter, and dancer

See also
Larose (surname)
De la Rose (surname)